Festival (축제 - Chukje) is a 1996 South Korean drama film directed by Im Kwon-taek, and based on the novel of the same title by Lee Cheong-jun.

Synopsis
A famous writer, Lee Joon-seop, returns to his hometown to attend his mother's funeral. Lee's illegitimate niece, who has been ostracized from the family, has also returned home for the funeral. While the funeral ceremonies take place, various old family conflicts reassert themselves. During the action of the story, a parallel children's story written by Lee is read by the illegitimate niece. The story describes a grandmother who gives her life force to her growing granddaughter, resulting in the grandmother becoming gradually younger until she reverts into an infant and finally leaves for the next world.

Director's statement

"In a sense, the life we enjoy now is the result of how our ancestors have lived. The [preceding] generations are bound to leave their legacy to the following generations-parents to their children, teachers to their students, and seniors to their juniors. Even a person who seems to lead an independent life by and of himself is strongly influenced by his ancestors. I see the entire process as tremendously beautiful and sincerely dream to show the viewers of my movie the true sense of this ongoing phenomenon.A funeral serves as the starting point for this movie. The funeral is for a warm-hearted eighty-seven-year-old lady who had strived to help those in need throughout her life.Through the motif of the funeral, the most extensively scaled ceremony in life, I have tried to explore the meaning of death and its effects shadowing the bereaved. I have also tried to bring to light the sentiments of the survivors: their sorrow, egoism, solemnity and even frivolity. I want to give the viewers who see this film a moment to think about what is truly valuable and precious in our quickly changing world. At this moment, I consider this goal my duty as a director.."-- Im Kwon-taek

Reception
During the 2000 Inter-Korean summit, North Korean leader, Kim Jong-il specifically mentioned Festival along with Im Kwon-taek's earlier Chunhyang (2000) as models of the type of cinematic works on which the two Koreas could work together.

Awards
 Best Film, Blue Dragon Film Awards

Availability
Festival was released on Region 3 DVD in South Korea with English subtitles, but as of October 2007 is currently out of print. It is available for viewing on the Korean Film Archive's YouTube page with English subtitles.

Notes

Sources
 
 
 
 
  
 Kim, Ji-seok. "On screen", Cinemaya #33, July 1996, p. 40-41.
 
 

1996 films
1996 drama films
South Korean drama films
Films based on Korean novels
Films directed by Im Kwon-taek
Best Picture Blue Dragon Film Award winners
1990s Korean-language films